Léopold Nkurikiye is a Burundian professional footballer who plays as a defender for Vital'O F.C. in the Burundi Football League.

International career
He was invited by Lofty Naseem, the national team coach, to represent Burundi in the 2014 African Nations Championship held in South Africa.

References

Living people
Burundi A' international footballers
2014 African Nations Championship players
Burundian footballers
Vital'O F.C. players
1989 births
Association football defenders